iliana emilia García (born 1970) is a Dominican-born, American visual artist and sculptor known for large-scale paintings and installations.  She is a co-founder of the Dominican York Proyecto GRÁFICA (DYPG) Collective. She currently lives and works in Brooklyn, New York. She is represented by ASR Contemporáneo.

Early life and education 
García was born into a family of poets, writers, and artists in Santo Domingo, Dominican Republic. As a child, she took art lessons with Elías Delgado and Nidia Serra, participating in international children art competitions in China and Brazil. A classically trained pianist, she attended the National Conservatory of Music in Santo Domingo, Dominican Republic. 

In 1989, García graduated summa cum laude with an AAS degree from Altos de Chavón School of Design in La Romana, Dominican Republic where she studied under Rafaél Álvarez, Carlos Montesino, and Russell Christopherson. She was awarded the Ruth Vanderpool Scholarship to attend Parsons School of Design in New York where she received a BFA in Communication Design in 1991. She settled permanently in New York in 1989. She is the sister of artist Scherezade García.

Residencies, awards and honors 

 Surf Point Foundation Residency, York, Maine, 2022.
 BRIClab: Bridge Space, Brooklyn, New York, 2021–2022.
 BRIC/Goya Residency, La Romana, Dominican Republic, 2018.
 Altos de Chavón School of Design Residency, 2013.
Occupy Wall Street Art Projects, 2010.
Aljira Emerge 8, A Career Management and Exhibition Program for Emerging Artists.
Citation, New York State Assembly, 2007.
Silver Medal, Children's Art Competition, China, 1978.

Art series 

Fresh Produce, 2000 Early on Holland Cotter spotted her using still-life themes of nourishment, consumption and decay in a group show in Harlem. "In a crisp, lucid installation, Iliana Emilia turns bread and water into a yeasty version of stripped-down Donald Judd furniture."Almas Transparentes, 2001 Early small scale charcoal on paper, before her installation pieces.Story Piles, 2012 Installation of chairs hung from the ceiling, some with neon strings representing people and events that pass through our lives. the histories of individual people, the resistance against change.The Pursuit of Happiness/Buscando Felicidad, 2014 This installation, made with wood, rope, metal hooks, and silkscreen features abstracted chairs against the wall, produces a vision of movement, migration, memories, and history.Yo. Aquí, Allá En Todas Partes/ I. Here, There and Everywhere, 2015  Chairs as a symbol of tradition, craftsmanship, and culture, specifically that of Dominican Republic. representing the emotional history of objects.Historias acumuladas, 2015 This is a three part series of works made with acrylic, ink, charcoal, and pencil on canvas was a clear inspiration for I. Here, There and Everywhere also of that year.
 The Sage and the Dreamer, 2018. In this site-specific installation at BRIC Gallery, 40 cabilma and oak wood and guano woven chairs are arranged in the form of a tree enveloping, rising and turning as branches towards the ceiling. As these hand-made woven chairs have become scarce in the Dominican Republic for about a decade, García commissioned a retired chair maker to build the chairs for the exhibition.

Selected Solo and Duo Exhibitions 

1996: To Get to Heaven/Para llegar al cielo, Galería Fundación de Arte Nouveau, Santo Domingo, Dominican Republic
2000: One Last Sitting, Hostos Center for the Arts and Culture, Bronx, New York
2001: Diario/Diary, IV Caribbean and Central America Biennial, Palacio de Bellas Artes, Santo Domingo, Dominican Republic
2003: Centro Docente Ego/Homeschooling, Centro Cultural de España, Santo Domingo, Dominican Republic
2010: RompeOLAS/Breaking the Sea, St. Francis College, Brooklyn, New York
2012: StoryPiles, The Tunnel, New York, New York
2015: DUOtone; Robert Dandarov and iliana emilia García, 490 Atlantic Gallery, Brooklyn, New York
2016: La razón/el objeto/la palabra, The Reason/The Object/The Word, Galería ASR Contemporáneo, Santo Domingo, Dominican Republic
2017: Home is Gold, Taller Boricua Gallery, Julia de Burgos Cultural Center, New York, New York
2019: Visual Memory: Home + Place, iliana emilia García + Scherezade García, Art Museum of the Americas, Washington, D.C. 
2022: Memory Keepers / Albaceas de la Memoria, William Patterson University, Wayne, New Jersey

Selected Group Exhibitions 

iliana emilia García has exhibited in international art fairs and biennials including Art Shanghai (2000), ARTissima (2000), E. León Jimenes Art Biennial (2000), ARCO (2001) Art Miami (2001, 2007), Art Caracas (2001), IV Caribbean and Central American Biennial (2001), SCOPE Art Fair (2005), Etnia-Art Fair (2011), III Trienal Poli/Gráfica de San Juan, América Latina y El Caribe (2012), Affordable Art Fair, New York (2012), Latin American Art Triennial (2016, 2019), among others.

 1991: Crossings, Henry Street Settlement Luis Abron Arts Center, New York, NY
1996: Manifesto, Mary Anthony Galleries, New York, NY
1996: XX National Bienal de la República Dominicana, Santo Domingo, Dominican Republic
 1999: Disorienting Signs, Leonora Vega Gallery, New York, NY
 2000: E. León Jimenes Art Biennal, Santiago, Dominican Republic
2001: DDNY 200: Dominican Designers in New York, Museo de Arte de Santo Domingo, Dominican Republic
2002: How February Was Born, Cinema SLAM, Brooklyn Academy of Music-Short Video Festival, Brooklyn, NY
2003: Proyecto Paraguas Invertidos, Museo de Bellas Artes Urbano Poggi, Rafaela, Argentina
2003: 10 Years of Editions, Joan Guaita Art, Palma de Mallorca, Spain
 2005: The S-Files, El Museo del Barrio, New York, NY
2005: Video-creadores-Iberoamericanos, Centro Cultural de España Juan de Salazar, Asunción, Paraguay
2006: PERIFERIA: Sin Título Gallery, San Juan, Puerto Rico
2007: ReGROUPING: 3 Generations of Latin American Artists, Mishkin Gallery, Baruch College, New York, NY

 2007: AWAY: Femmes, Diaspora, Créativite et Dialogue, Secur Hall, UNESCO, Paris, France
 2007: Video-creadores-iberoamericanos, Instituto Artes Visuales, Valencia, Spain
 2007: Aljira Emerge 8, Aljira Center of Contemporary Art, Newark, NJ
2008: LOOP Video Festival, Valencia, Spain
2009: FUSION, Biggs Museum of American Art, Dover, DE
2011: About Change in Latin America and the Caribbean, The World Bank, Washington, DC
2012: Actualizaciones y Manifestaciones-Dominican York, Celaja, Mexico
2012: El panal/The Hive, Third Triennial Poli/Gráfica de San Juan y el Caribe, San Juan, Puerto Rico
2012: Flores y espinas, Museo de Arte de El Salvador, San Salvador, El Salvador
2013: Our America: The Latino Presence in American Art, Smithsonian American Art Museum, Washington, DC (and national tour)
2013: Infinite Regions: Hiroko Ohno, Dana Schmertz and Iliana Emilia Garcia, The Grady Alexis Gallery, New York
 2014: Reality of Placement, Fordham University, Bronx, NY
2015: Memorial, ACTe Museum, Basse Terre, Guadaloupe
2016: Resilience: Reclaiming History and the Dominican Diaspora, Inter-American Development Bank, Washington, DC
2018: Empathy, Smack Mellon Gallery, Brooklyn, NY
2018: Queenie: Selected Artworks by Female Artists from El Museo del Barrio's Collection, Hunter College East Harlem Gallery, New York, NY
 2019: Culture and the People: El Museo del Barrio, 1969-2019, Part I: Selections from the Permanent Collection, El Museo del Barrio, New York, NY
2021: Trayectos, Centro Cultural de España, Santo Domingo, Dominican Republic

Collections 
iliana emilia García's art is collected by museums, corporations and private collectors.  Her work is found in the permanent collections of the Smithsonian American Art Museum, El Museo del Barrio, Centro Cultural Eduardo León Jimenes, Museo de Arte Moderno de Santo Domingo, Joan Guaita Art, Centro de Arte Fundacíon Ortíz-Gurdian, Pierre Restany Collection, Cariforo Institute, Colección de Arte del Palacio Nacional de la República Dominicana, Fundación Centro de Arte Nouveau, and others. 

Her artist papers iliana emilia garcia Papers 1987-2014  are part of the Archives of American Art, Smithsonian Institution.

References

Further reading 
 Anreus, Alejandro. "The Language of Drawing, of Hearts, Chairs and Boats: A Conversation with iliana emilia García." In iliana emilia Garcia: The Reason/The Object/The Word, edited by Olga U. Herrera. Washington, D.C.: Art Museum of the Americas, 2020, pp. 40-44.
Bazzano-Nelson, Florencia. “Preparing for Our America: Imagining Migration, iliana emilia garcia’s Chairs.” Eye Level, Smithsonian American Art Museum Blog, August 15, 2013.
Cotter, Holland. “Art in Review: Fresh Produce.” The New York Times, May 12, 2000.
 Cotter, Holland. “A New Latino Essence: Remixed and Redistilled.” The New York Times, Nov. 28, 2003.
 Cotter, Holland. “Latino Art, and Beyond Category.” The New York Times, September 2, 2005
 Cullen, Deborah. "In These Days." In The S-Files 2005 (The Selected Files). Exh. cat. New York: El Museo del Barrio, 2005.
Dardashti, Abigail Lapin, et al. Bordering the Imaginary: Art from the Dominican Republic, Haiti, and Their Diasporas. Exh. cat. Brooklyn, New York: BRIC, 2018.
Edgecombe, Wallace I. Foreword. In One Last Sitting: ‘Apostolado’ of What I Have Always Had Present. Exh. Cat. The Hostos Center for the Arts and Culture and Creative Art Source, 2000.
 Gómez Jorge, Paula. "The Presence of An Abscence: Artifices of Memory."  In iliana emilia Garcia: The Reason/The Object/The Word, edited by Olga U. Herrera. Washington, D.C.: Art Museum of the Americas, 2020, pp. 16-19.
Herrera, Olga U. ed. iliana emilia Garcia: The Reason/The Object/The Word. Washington, D.C.: Art Museum of the Americas, 2020.
Herrera, Olga U. "iliana emilia García and Neo-Pop Art: [Re]Visiting One Last Supper." In iliana emilia Garcia: The Reason/The Object/The Word, edited by Olga U. Herrera. Washington, D.C.: Art Museum of the Americas, 2020, pp. 27-37.
Perry, Ana Cristina. "iliana emilia García: Emotional History and the Development of Symbolic Memory." In iliana emilia Garcia: The Reason/The Object/The Word, edited by Olga U. Herrera. Washington, D.C.: Art Museum of the Americas, 2020, pp. 20-26.
“Queenie: Selected Artworks by Female Artists from El Museo Del Barrio's Collection.” New York: Hunter East Harlem Gallery.
Ramos, E. Carmen. "iliana emilia garcía." In Our America: The Latino Presence in American Art. Exh. cat. Washington D.C.: Smithsonian American Art Museum, 2013, pp. 162-165.
 Sullivan, Edward J. "Immutable Fragility." In iliana emilia: Chosen Hearts. Exh. cat. New York: Howard Scott Gallery, 2001.
Zimmer, William. Art in review, New York Times, Bronx edition, 1991.

External links 

Archives of American Art, Smithsonian Institution
Storytelling with Chairs, BRIC TV

1970 births
Living people
21st-century Dominican Republic artists
Dominican Republic women artists
People from Santo Domingo
Parsons School of Design alumni
20th-century women artists
21st-century women artists